Jones Branch is a stream in the U.S. state of Missouri. It is a tributary of Pee Dee Creek.

Jones Branch has the name of the local Jones family.

See also
List of rivers of Missouri

References

Rivers of Marion County, Missouri
Rivers of Shelby County, Missouri
Rivers of Missouri